Glenea rondoni is a species of beetle in the family Cerambycidae. It was described by Stephan von Breuning in 1963. It is known from Thailand and Laos.

References

rondoni
Beetles described in 1963